Bárbara Bermudo (born June 5, 1975) is a Puerto Rican journalist and one of the eight cover subjects of the 2007 edition of People en Españols "50 Most Beautiful People".

TV and film career
Bermudo, who was born in Guaynabo to a Puerto Rican mother and a Cuban father, has a degree in journalism from American University in Washington, D.C., was the host of Primer Impacto, a Spanish language news program which covers predominantly human interest stories and is popular among the Hispanic population in the United States, until she was laid off on January 5, 2017. Bermudo joined the program in 2002 when the show's original host María Celeste Arrarás had left and co-hosted it Myrka Dellanos until she left in 2004, and also with Fernando Del Rincón until he was let go in 2008.

In 2003, Bermudo had a small role playing herself in the film Chasing Papi, starring Roselyn Sanchez, Jaci Velasquez, and Sofía Vergara.

In 2004 and 2005, Bermudo hosted Lo Que no vio de Premios lo Nuestro (What you didn't see in Lo Nuestro Awards) and Noche de Estrellas (The Night of Stars). Bermudo has made television appearances in El Show de Cristina, El Escandalo del Mediodia (The Midday Scandal), and Que Bodas (What a Wedding). She is one of the eight cover subjects of the 2007 edition of People en Español's "50 Most Beautiful People" issue.

Fashion career
In 2013, Bermudo started CAMI, her own line of girls' and women's clothing, shoes, and accessories. The brand name is formed from combining her daughters' names (Camila and Mía).

Personal life
She married Mario Andrés Moreno, a journalist of Colombian descent in a Dade County courthouse and later had an elaborate wedding on November 29, 2008 in the Dominican Republic. In February 2009, Bermudo confirmed to "People en Español" that she was pregnant and on Friday, May 15, 2009, she gave birth to a girl named Mia Andrea. On Monday, October 18, 2010, she gave birth to her second daughter named Camila Andrea. On February 26, 2015 Bermudo announced she was expecting her 3rd child which was a girl on Univision's morning show Despierta America  On August 1, 2015, she gave birth to Sofia Andrea Moreno.

See also

List of Puerto Ricans
History of women in Puerto Rico

References

External links
 Official Website 

1975 births
Living people
American University alumni
Puerto Rican people of Cuban descent
People from Guaynabo, Puerto Rico
Puerto Rican journalists
American television talk show hosts
Puerto Rican television personalities